Nīca Municipality is a former municipality in Courland, Latvia. The administrative center was the village of Nīca. As of 2020, the municipality's population was 3,100.

Geography 

The municipality was located in western Latvia, on the coast of the Baltic Sea. The westernmost point in Latvia was located within its territory. Parts of the municipality lie below sea level. Its geography is dominated by coastal plains, and its territory is part of the Bartava Plain region.

History 
The municipality was formed in 2009 by merging Nīca parish and Otaņķi parish, as part of the 2009 administrative reform.

Nīca Municipality ceased to exist on 1 July 2021, when it was merged into the newly-formed South Kurzeme Municipality.

Subdivision 
The municipality was subdivided into 2 parishes, namely:

 Nīca parish
 Otaņķi parish

See also 
 Administrative divisions of Latvia (2009)

References

External links 

 Nīca Municipality on OpenStreetMap

 
Former municipalities of Latvia